Chin Chun Hock (1844–1927; , also sometimes transcribed as Chin Ching-hock) was the first Chinese man to settle in Seattle, Washington. He arrived in 1860 and was employed as a domestic worker. By 1868, he had founded a general merchandising store, The Wa Chong Co. (Chinese Prosperity), at the foot of Mill Street. He owned the Eastern Hotel which housed the first Asian workers in Seattle.

References

1844 births
1927 deaths
Businesspeople from Seattle
Chinese emigrants to the United States
Date of birth unknown
Date of death missing
Place of birth unknown

19th-century American businesspeople